Longitarsus quadriguttatus is a species of beetle in the leaf beetle family. It is distributed in Central and south-eastern Europe, Asia Minor and the Caucasus. Adults and larvae feed on the leaves of Boraginaceae species, as well as Cynoglossum officinale and Echium vulgare.

Varieties
Variety: Longitarsus quadriguttatus var. binotatus (Weise, 1888)
Variety: Longitarsus quadriguttatus var. immaculatus (Weise, 1888)
Variety: Longitarsus quadriguttatus var. vittatus (Weise, 1888)

References

Q
Beetles described in 1763
Beetles of Asia
Beetles of Europe
Taxa named by Erik Pontoppidan